Central Kitsap School District 401 is a public school district in Kitsap County, Washington, United States.  It serves unincorporated portions of the county, including the community of Silverdale, and portions of the City of Bremerton.
As of June 2014, the district has an enrollment of 11,091 students.  Approximately one-quarter of students are from military families, and one half are from families economically dependent on the US Navy.
It consists of CK High and Middle school,  Klahowya, and other schools like Ridgetop or Fairview

Superintendent
The Superintendent of CK Schools is Dr. Erin Prince, replacing Mr. David McViker.

Schools

High schools
Central Kitsap High School (Silverdale)
Klahowya Secondary School (Grades 6-12) (Silverdale)
Olympic High School (Bremerton)

Middle schools
Central Kitsap Middle School (Silverdale)
Fairview Middle School (Bremerton)
Ridgetop Middle School (Silverdale)

Elementary schools
Brownsville Elementary (Bremerton)
Clear Creek Elementary (Silverdale; near Bangor)
Cottonwood Elementary (Bremerton)
Cougar Valley Elementary (Silverdale)
Emerald Heights Elementary (Silverdale)
Esquire Hills Elementary (Bremerton)
Green Mountain Elementary (Bremerton)
Hawk Elementary at Jackson Park (Bremerton)
Pinecrest Elementary (Bremerton)
Silverdale Elementary (Silverdale)
Silver Ridge Elementary (Silverdale)
Woodlands Elementary (Bremerton)

K-12 Community School
Barker Creek Community School  (Bremerton)

References

External links
Central Kitsap School District
OSPI Report Card 2013-14
Area map of schools

School districts in Washington (state)
Education in Kitsap County, Washington